W 31 or W31 may refer to

W31, an American nuclear warhead in service 1959-89
, a British dredger hopper barge, the Empire Dockland, in service from 1944 to at least 1980.
W31, one of the largest giant molecular cloud H II regions in the Milky Way, containing the radio nebula G10.0-0.3, the luminous blue variable LBV 1806-20, the magnetar/soft gamma-ray repeater SGR 1806-20, and the surrounding star cluster.